Jhonny Ferreira Camacho (born 5 December 1977) is a Venezuelan football manager, currently in charge of Monagas.

Career
Born in Caracas, Ferreira began his career with C.S. Colegio San Agustín El Paraíso, and was later an assistant manager at Estrella Roja, Venezuela U17 and Caracas. On 31 May 2013, he was appointed manager of Primera División side Carabobo.

Ferreira resigned from Carabobo on 1 October 2015, and was named in charge of fellow league team Monagas on 24 May of the following year.

References

External links
 

1977 births
Living people
Sportspeople from Caracas
Venezuelan football managers
Venezuelan Primera División managers
Carabobo F.C. managers
Monagas S.C. managers